Matthías Guðmundsson (born 1 August 1980) is an Icelandic former footballer who played as a winger.

International career 
Guðmundsson made his debut for Iceland at the age of 26 in an August 2006 friendly match against Spain, coming on as a substitute for Gunnar Heiðar Þorvaldsson. He has been capped four times.

References

External links 

 
 
 

1980 births
Living people
Association football wingers
Matthías Guðmundsson
Matthías Guðmundsson
Matthías Guðmundsson
Matthías Guðmundsson
Matthías Guðmundsson
Matthías Guðmundsson
Matthías Guðmundsson